Kruttikaa,  is a popular Kannada television and Kannada cinema actress who is best known for her acting in "Radha Kalyana" TV show which was telecast on Zee Kannada. She also appeared in the Kannada TV reality show "Bigg Boss Kannada 3", and aired on Colors Kannada Channel from 25 October 2015. She entered in the house on the first day of the show and was in the Bigg Boss house for 63 day.

Early life
Kruttika was born to Havyaka Brahmin Parents in Sagar Taluk in Karnataka. Her father is late Dr. Ravindra and Mother Smt. Meenakruti Meena, a school teacher.  Kruttika completed her education at Sadhana Vidya Kendra, Anandapuram in Sagara.

Career
She made her debut on silver screen with the Kannada film ‘Patre Loves Padma’. She came into prominence with the lead role in daily soap opera ‘Radha Kalyana’ which aired on Zee Kannada. She has acted in Kengulabi In this emotional role she feels lucky for getting to perform Five Shades  and is also acting in Yarige Yaruntu

Filmography

Television

References

External links
 

1994 births
Living people
Kannada actresses
Actresses from Karnataka
Actresses in Kannada cinema